This is a list of episodes from the anime Baby Steps. The Baby Steps anime series began airing on April 6, 2014. It was simulcast with English, Spanish, and Portuguese subtitles by Crunchyroll through NHK Enterprise. The series lasted a total of 25 episodes from April 6, 2014, to September 21, 2014. A second season was announced for Spring 2015. Like season 1, season 2 was simulcast by Crunchyroll.

Baby Steps
The first season of Baby Steps introduces us to Eiichirō Maruo. He is a person who manages to get straight A's in all of his classes from his meticulous note taking. One day he decides he needs to put more exercise into his schedule and finds a pamphlet for a free tennis class. Eiichirō attends and falls in love with the game. He slowly turns his habits from studying for class to studying for tennis. Season 1 covers the first two years and introduces us to his friends at STC Tennis Club.

Opening theme: "Believe in Yourself" by Mao Abe

Ending theme: "Baby Steps" written by Shota Horie, performed by Baby Raids

Baby Steps 2
For season 2 Eiichirō has decided he wants to go pro. His mother has said he must win the All-Japan Juniors this year if he is going to become a Pro. If he fails, he must return to a life of studying for a doctorate degree of some sort. Eiichirō is given permission to attend a scholarship program in Florida as part of the training. The scholarship lasts for two weeks. New characters are introduced as Eiichirō finds out how different tennis is in the world compared to tennis in Japan. Among the characters are 19-year-old Pro Alex O'Brien and his younger sister Marcia.

Opening theme: "Believe in Yourself" by Mao Abe

Ending theme: "Yume no Tsuzuki" by Ganbare! Victory

References 

Baby Steps